Ryan Hogarth (born 25 January 1992) is a Scottish professional darts player who plays in Professional Darts Corporation (PDC) events.

Career
In 2018, Hogarth qualified for the 2019 BDO World Darts Championship as a qualifier, but he lost 3–1 to Oliver Ferenc of Serbia in the preliminary round. At the start of the following year, Hogarth reached the final of the Dutch Open, losing out 3–2 to Richard Veenstra.

He qualified for the 2020 BDO World Darts Championship as the 15th seed, but lost in the second round to Jim Williams.

Hogarth started to compete in the PDC circuit in 2020.

World Championship results

BDO
 2019: Preliminary round (lost to Oliver Ferenc 1–3)
 2020: Second round (lost to Jim Williams 0–4)

External links
 Ryan Hogarth's profile and stats on Darts Database

References

Living people
Scottish darts players
1992 births
British Darts Organisation players
Professional Darts Corporation associate players